The Movement for Social Humanism (Dvizhenie za sotsialen humanizam) is a progressive political party in Bulgaria formed in 2003. It is part of the Coalition for Bulgaria, an alliance led by the Bulgarian Socialist Party. The coalition won in the 2001 elections 17.1% of the popular vote and 48 out of 240 seats. At the last legislative elections, 25 June 2005, the Coalition won 34.2% of the popular vote and 82 out of 240 seats. The party has only 1 seat.

Social democratic parties in Bulgaria
Political parties with year of establishment missing
Progressive parties